Ulupamir is a village in Erciş district, Van Province, Turkey.

History

Ulupamir (meaning Great Pamir) is a village of mostly Kyrgyz. They came from the Great Pamir and Little Pamir in the Wakhan, northern Afghanistan, in 1982.  They fled to Pakistan in 1978 in the aftermath of the Saur Revolution.  However they did not adjust well to the hot Pakistani climate and the unsanitary conditions of the refugee camp, so much so that 450 of them lost their lives.  They requested 5,000 visas from the United States Consulate in Peshawar for resettlement in Alaska (a region that shares the climate and temperature of the Wakhan). Their request was denied.  To solve this situation the group leader proposed to go to Turkey as immigrants and submitted a request for help to the Turkish Embassy in Pakistan.

Kyrgyz from Wakhan region of Afghanistan moved to Pakistan in the 1970s. Nearly 1,100 of these were accepted by Turkey to settle in Ulupamir (or “Great Pamir” in Kyrgyz), their resettlement village in Van Province.

The Turkish Military Government, led by Kenan Evren, having recently taken power in the September 12th coup, accepted this request. 1,150 of the Kyrgyz were taken to Adana by plane. After this they were separated between Malatya and Van Provinces. In 1983, the government of Turgut Özal settled them in the village of Ulupamir where 3,850 Kyrgyz Turks now live.

The documentary film 37 Uses for a Dead Sheep - the story of the Pamir Kirghiz was based on the life of these Kyrgyz in their new home.

Culture 
The village has a cultural organization called the "Pamir Cultural Education Organization" which attempts to preserve their cultural and family traditions and hand crafts. 
.

Traditions
Generally speaking, they have an older Turkish culture. They are very hospitable and are known for their folk dances and colorful weddings.

Every year in June there is an Ayran Fair which works to preserve the village's identity and unique culture. The event starts by reading the Epic of Manas, with traditional clothes, handcrafts, decorations and symbols on display. The national sport of the Kyrgyz, the mounted "Kökbörü" (Gökböğrü or Buskashi) is played as well as an eating contest.

Food

The traditional foods include manti stuffed with Five Fingers, Kyrgyz rice, bread and meat, different types of meat and cheese börek and various types of doughy food.

Geography 
The village is located 132 kilometres from Van and 32 kilometres from Erciş.

Climate
The village shares Turkey's continental climate zone.

Economy
The village's economy is based primarily on agriculture and animal husbandry.

References 

Villages in Van Province
Turkish people of Afghan descent
Ethnic Kyrgyz people